Newtowncashel is a village located near Lough Ree in County Longford, Ireland. It is within the townland of Cornadowagh. Newtowncashel won the Irish Tidy Towns Competition in 1980.

History

Name 
Situated on the north-eastern shore of Lough Ree on the River Shannon, Newtowncashel was previously known as Cor na Dumhca in Irish - an ancient name meaning the 'Round Hill of the Cauldron'.

Built heritage 
There are a number of ringfort sites close to the village, including several in the townlands of Cornadowagh, Ballyrevagh and Cross.

Five castles are recorded in the area, including Elfeet, Caltramore, Corool, Portanure and the castle of Baile Nui (Newtown). The ruins of Elfeet Castle can still be seen. George Calvert, the owner of a 15th-century tower house in the area, was involved in the colonisation of the Province of Maryland in America.

Religious sites 
Two historic religious sites in the Newtowncashel area are Inis Clothrann (or Quakers Island) where St Diarmuid founded an abbey in 540 AD, and Saints' Island where St Kevin founded a monastery in 544 AD. The ruins of the old parish church, St Catherine's, are on the side of Cashel Hill overlooking Lough Ree.

During the period of the Penal Laws, when Catholic observances were outlawed, people in the parish of Cashel assembled for worship at mass rocks close to Lady Well (in Derrydarragh townland) and at Derryhaun.

The current Roman Catholic church was built in 1833 in a Gothic revival style.

Amenities 
Culnagore Wood (Wood of the Oak) covers an area of 90 acres along the edge of Lough Ree. Also nearby is Carrowmore Wood, a forest of pine and spruce on a hill within the parish. A short distance from the town is Lough Slawn, which is surrounded by meadows and bog lands. Cashel Commons ('The Ranch') is a 200 acre commonage which has several walking routes.

Barley Harbour is cut-limestone harbour located outside the village on the lakeshore. Four groups of islands are in the parish of Cashel: the Black Islands; Clawinch, Priests' Island and Inis Clothrann. On Saints' Island are the ruins of an Augustinian monastery where a canon Augustine McGradion (Uighistin Mag Ráidhin) compiled the Annals of [All] Saints (Annales Prioratus Insulae Omnium SS) in the 15th century. This island can now be accessed via a causeway.

References 

Towns and villages in County Longford
Mass rocks